Lanthier may refer to:

 Claude Lanthier (1933–2015), Canadian politician
 Jean-Marc Lanthier (ice hockey) (born 1963), professional ice hockey player from Quebec
 Jean-Marc Lanthier (Canadian Army officer), Canadian Army officer
 Jennifer Lanthier (born 1964), Canadian children's author and journalist
 J. Spencer Lanthier (born 1940), Canadian chartered accountant and corporate director
 Richard Lanthier, member of the Canadian rock band April Wine

See also
 Lantier (disambiguation)